The Leader was a weekly newspaper in Melbourne, Victoria. It was a "companion weekly" to the daily newspaper The Age, and was edited by David Syme's brother George Syme.

Its first issue was released on 3 February 1855, under the title "The Weekly Age".

Henry Short was editor from 1887 to 1925.

A longtime contributor to The Leader was Julian Thomas (1843–1896), who wrote as "The Vagabond" or "The Vag".

Digitization
The National Library of Australia has digitized photographic copies of most issues of The Leader from Vol X, No. 314 of 4 January 1862 to No. 3,285 of 28 December 1918 and which may be accessed via Trove. They have also scanned some editions from 1935.

References

External links 
 

Defunct newspapers published in Melbourne
Publications established in 1855 
1855 establishments in Australia
Weekly newspapers published in Australia